Graeme Scarratt (born 14 September 1945) is a former English cricketer.  Scarratt was a left-handed batsman who bowled leg break.  He was born in Hartlepool, County Durham.

Scarratt made his debut for Durham against the Yorkshire Second XI in the 1968 Minor Counties Championship.  He played Minor counties cricket for Durham from 1968 to 1972, making 24 Minor Counties Championship appearances.  He made his only List A appearance against Oxfordshire in the 1972 Gillette Cup.  In this match, he was dismissed for 4 runs by Saeed Hatteea.

References

External links
Graeme Scarratt at ESPNcricinfo
Graeme Scarratt at CricketArchive

1945 births
Living people
Sportspeople from Hartlepool
Cricketers from County Durham
English cricketers
Durham cricketers